Patrick Deely (18 February 1864 – 28 February 1925) was an Australian cricketer. He played one first-class cricket match for Victoria in 1884.

See also
 List of Victoria first-class cricketers

References

External links
 

1864 births
1925 deaths
Australian cricketers
Victoria cricketers
Cricketers from Melbourne